Antonio Ponzano, Ponzoni or Bonzone (died 1602, in Munich) was an Italian Mannerist painter active in the 16th century.

His birthplace is unknown - it may have been Venice, since he was influenced by the Venetian style. He was a studio assistant to Giulio Licinio in 1565 at the court of Maximilian II, Holy Roman Emperor in Vienna. Between 1550 and 1600 a large number of Italian painters moved to the Wittelsbach ducal court. Major banking families such as the Fuggers were also major art patrons - Ponzano himself was an assistant to Friedrich Sustris between 1569 and 1573 in Augsburg, where Sustris was working for Hans Fugger. Between 1585 and 1597 Ponzano was at the court in Munich.

Some of Ponzano's 1570-1572 paintings with 'grottesche' survive in the Fugger palace in Augsburg, as well as some of his studio work for Sustris. He also assisted Sustris and Alessandro Scalzi (known as Il Paduano) on their 1580 work at Trausnitz Castle at Landshut - there Ponzano worked on the lodges in the castle, creating scenes of mythological love affairs. Sustris designed the Grottenhof at the Munich Residenz, with the shells and grotesques painted by Ponzano and the Dutchman Pieter de Witte.

References

1602 deaths
16th-century Italian painters